Lola Liivat (born in 1928 in Tallinn) is an Estonian abstract expressionist painter.

In 1954, she graduated from Tartu Art School.

Since 1954, she has exhibited her paintings in Estonia and abroad.

In 2001, she was awarded with Order of the White Star, medal class.

Gallery

References

Living people
1928 births
Estonian women painters
20th-century Estonian women artists
Abstract expressionist artists
Estonian Academy of Arts alumni
Recipients of the Order of the White Star, Medal Class
Artists from Tallinn